The Columbus Blue Jackets are an American professional ice hockey team based in Columbus, Ohio. They play in the Metropolitan Division of the Eastern Conference in the National Hockey League (NHL). The team joined the NHL in 2000 as an expansion team. The Blue Jackets have played their home games at the Nationwide Arena since their inaugural season. The franchise is owned by John P. McConnell and Jarmo Kekalainen is their general manager.

There have been 10 head coaches for the Blue Jackets franchise. The team's first head coach was Dave King, who coached for three seasons. Ken Hitchcock coached the team to its first playoff appearance. Scott Arniel was the head coach of the Blue Jackets from 2010 through 2012. Todd Richards was named interim head coach on January 9, 2012, and would remain with the team for more than 3½ seasons. John Tortorella became the head coach on October 21, 2015, and left the team following the 2020–21 season with the Blue Jackets' highest winning percentage (.568).

Key

Coaches
Note: Statistics are correct through the end of the 2020–21 season.

Notes
 A running total of the number of coaches of the Blue Jackets. Thus, any coach who has two or more separate terms as head coach is only counted once.
 Before the 2005–06 season, the NHL instituted a penalty shootout for regular season games that remained tied after a five-minute overtime period, which prevented ties.
Each year is linked to an article about that particular NHL season.

References
General

Specific

 
Columbus Blue Jackets head coaches
Head coaches